Mónica Desirée Monsiváis Salayandia (born 19 January 1988) is a Mexican professional footballer who last played as a forward for C.F. Monterrey.

Club career
In 2014, she played with the Toronto Lady Lynx.

In 2015, Monsiváis played for Kazakhstani side BIIK Kazygurt, where she made 24 appearances and scored 17 goals.

In September 2021, Monsiváis became the first player to have scored 100 goals in Liga MX Femenil.

After playing for C.F. Monterrey since the inception of Liga MX Femenil in 2017, Monsiváis joined Scottish side Glasgow City in July 2022. She made her league debut for Glasgow City as a substitute in a 1–0 victory over Motherwell on 14 August 2022. Monsiváis left Glasgow City by mutual consent after five months with the club.

International career
Monsiváis represented Mexico at the 2016 CONCACAF Women's Olympic Qualifying Championship.

International goals
Scores and results list Mexico's goal tally first

References

External links
 
 

1988 births
Living people
Women's association football forwards
Mexican women's footballers
Footballers from Durango
People from Gómez Palacio, Durango
Mexico women's international footballers
Universiade silver medalists for Mexico
Universiade medalists in football
Medalists at the 2013 Summer Universiade
BIIK Kazygurt players
Liga MX Femenil players
C.F. Monterrey (women) players
Glasgow City F.C. players
Mexican expatriate women's footballers
Mexican expatriate sportspeople in Kazakhstan
Expatriate women's footballers in Kazakhstan
Toronto Lady Lynx players
Mexican expatriate sportspeople in Scotland
Mexican expatriate sportspeople in Canada
Expatriate women's footballers in Scotland
Expatriate women's soccer players in Canada
Scottish Women's Premier League players
Mexican footballers